Loyalhanna Lake is a reservoir of about 480 acres on Loyalhanna Creek located in Loyalhanna Township, Westmoreland County near Saltsburg. The U.S. Army Corps of Engineers operates the dam that forms the lake.

See also

 List of rivers of Pennsylvania
 List of tributaries of the Allegheny River

References

External links
 Loyalhanna Lake National Recreation Area

Reservoirs in Pennsylvania